Ermidas-Sado is a civil parish in the municipality of Santiago do Cacém, Portugal. The population in 2011 was 2,020, in an area of 82.40 km2.

References

Freguesias of Santiago do Cacém